Gittis is a surname. Notable people with the surname include:

Andrew Gittis (born 1998), Canadian curler
Howard Gittis (1934–2007), American attorney
Vladimir Gittis (1881–1938), Soviet military commander and komkor

See also
Gattis